Psammophilus is a genus of agamid lizards found in India. Although the genus name means "sand loving" in Greek, they are found in rocky habitats.

Species

References

Psammophilus
Lizard genera
Taxa named by Leopold Fitzinger